Sociedad Deportiva Ibiza was a Spanish football club based in Ibiza Town, in the autonomous community of Balearic Islands.

Founded in 1956, the club came to play eight seasons in Segunda División B, but disappeared in 1997 due to serious economic problems.

Following the club's disappearance, another side in the town took its place, being named SE Eivissa-Ibiza.

Season to season

8 seasons in Segunda División B
25 seasons in Tercera División

Famous players

External links
Club history 

Sport in Ibiza
Defunct football clubs in the Balearic Islands
Association football clubs established in 1956
Association football clubs disestablished in 1997
1956 establishments in Spain
1997 disestablishments in Spain